Dan Lamar Alexander (born June 17, 1955) is a former offensive tackle and guard who played thirteen seasons in the National Football League (NFL) for the New York Jets. Alexander attended Louisiana State University and was drafted in the 8th round of the 1977 NFL draft.

References

1955 births
Living people
Players of American football from Houston
American football offensive linemen
LSU Tigers football players
New York Jets players
Ed Block Courage Award recipients